Poenaru, Poienaru are the Romanian surnames of:

 Constantin Poenaru (1842–1912), Romanian general
 Dorin N. Poenaru (born 1936), Romanian nuclear physicist and engineer
 Gheorghe Poenaru (born 1956), Romanian footballer
  (1937–2004), Romanian historian and numismatist
 Petrache Poenaru (1799–1875), Romanian inventor
 Petrache Poenaru metro station, metro station in Bucharest
 Sorin Poenaru (born 1938), Romanian Olympic fencer
 Valentin Poénaru (born 1932), Romanian-French mathematician
 Poénaru conjecture

See also 
 Poiana (disambiguation)
 Poienari (disambiguation)

Romanian-language surnames